Khandwa is a city and a nagar nigam in the Nimar region of Madhya Pradesh, India. It is the administrative headquarters of the Khandwa district, formerly known as East Nimar District.

Khandwa is a major railway junction; the Malwa line connecting Indore with the Deccan meets the main east–west line from Mumbai to Kolkata.

In May 2019, Nandkumar Singh Chauhan of Bharatiya Janata Party had been elected as the Member of Parliament from Khandwa Lok Sabha constituency.

History

The name of the city is derived from "Khandav Van", which literally means Khandav Forests.

Ancient history
Recent explorations in the beds/tributaries of Narmada have revealed traces of the Paleolithic men in East Nimar district. Omkar Mandhata, a rocky island on the bank of Narmada river, about 47 miles north-west of Khandwa, is said to have been conquered by the Haihaya king Mahishmant, who had named the same as Mahishmati.

During the rise of Buddhism, the East Nimar region was included in Avanti Kingdom under Chand Pradyota Mahesana, which was later added to the growing empire of Magadha by Shishunaga. From the early 2nd century BC to late 15th century AD, the Nimar Region (earlier a part of Khandesh) was ruled by many dynasties, which include Mauryas, Shungas, Early Satvahanas, Kardamakas, and Abhiras (Ahir Gavli). Vakatakas, Imperial Guptas, Kalchuris, Vardhanas (of Harsha Vardhana fame), Chalukyas,  Rashtrakutas, Paramaras, Faruki Dynasty.

Geography

It has an average elevation of 313 metres (1026 feet).

Demographics

As of the 2011 Census of India, Khandwa had a population of 200,738, of which 102,901 were males and 97,837 were females. Population within the age group of 0 to 6 years was 24,801. The total number of literates in Khandwa was 151,545, which constituted 75.5% of the population with male literacy of 78.9% and female literacy of 71.9%. The effective literacy rate of 7+ population of Khandwa was 86.1%, of which male literacy rate was 90.4% and female literacy rate was 81.7%. The Scheduled Castes and Scheduled Tribes population was 27,430 and 8,139 respectively. There were 39002 households in Khandwa in 2011.

Hindi is the most spoken language. Nimadi is the local dialect. Urdu, Marathi and Sindhi are also common.

Culture/Citiscape

Places of interest

 Ganguli House, the ancestral home of Ashok Kumar and Kishore Kumar. Also named Gauri Kunj, after their mother.
 Samadhi of Kishore Kumar.
 Four Kunds located in four directions of the city, called Padam Kund, Bheem Kund, Suraj Kund and Rameshwar Kund. 
Dada Darbar, popularly known as Shri Dadaji Dhuniwale.

Notable people

Ashok Kumar, actor
Anoop Kumar, actor
Kishore Kumar, actor and singer
Makhanlal Chaturvedi, poet
Saroo Brierley, real name was Sheru Munshi Khan prior to adoption

Transport 
The nearest commercial airport is Indore. It also has an airstrip which is rarely used for occasional aircraft landings, located on Nagchun Road.

Khandwa has a major railway junction located on the Jabalpur-Bhusaval section of Howrah-Allahabad-Mumbai line.

In popular culture
 The town was featured in the 2016 Australian biographical film Lion, which was based on the extraordinary search for his birth family by Khandwa-born Saroo Brierley, who got lost as a child and ended up in Australia after being adopted.

See also
Mahishmati
Burhanpur

References

 
Cities and towns in Khandwa district
Cities in Madhya Pradesh